"Oh Yeah" is the first single released from Rottin Razkals debut album, Rottin ta da Core. It was released on February 17, 1995, and was both written and produced by the Razkals' mentors, Naughty by Nature. This single was the most successful of the two singles released from the album, finding its best success on the Hot Rap Singles peaking at 14. The song sampled "Say Yeah" by the Commodores.

Single track listing

A-Side
"Oh Yeah" (LP Version)- 3:28
"Oh Yeah" (Radio Version)- 3:28
"Oh Yeah" (Instrumental)- 3:27
"Oh Yeah" (Acapella)- 2:55

B-Side
"A-Yo" (LP Version)- 3:21
"A-Yo" (Radio Version)- 2:56
"A-Yo" (A-Yomental)- 3:20

1994 songs
1995 debut singles
Song recordings produced by Naughty by Nature
Songs written by Treach
Songs written by Vin Rock
Songs written by KayGee